Gom Eshaq (also Romanized as Gom Esḩāq; also known as Gomeh Esḩāq) is a village in Azari Rural District, in the Central District of Esfarayen County, North Khorasan Province, Iran. At the 2006 census, its population was 18, in 5 families.

References 

Populated places in Esfarayen County